George Arthur Frederick Seber (born 6 April 1938) is an Australian-born New Zealand statistician. Since his retirement from academic life, he has worked as a counsellor.

Biography
Born in Sydney in 1938, Seber emigrated to New Zealand with his family at the end of World War II. He attended the Auckland University College, graduating with an MSc with first-class honours in 1960, and won a Commonwealth scholarship to undertake PhD in statistics at the University of Manchester. Completing his doctorate in 1963, he took up an assistant lectureship in statistics at the London School of Economics. In 1965 he and the statistician George Jolly simultaneously published accounts of the capture-recapture model of estimating biological population sizes, that came to be called the Jolly-Seber model. The same year, he returned to the University of Auckland, where he worked until retirement, except for a brief stint from 1971 to 1972 as professor of statistics at the University of Otago.

Seber was elected a Fellow of the Royal Society of New Zealand in 1997, and in 1999 he was awarded the society's Hector Medal.

Since formally retiring from academic life, Seber gained a Diploma in Counselling and currently works part-time as a counsellor.

Seber has written several books including Can We Believe It?, Counseling Issues, Coping with Dying, Alcohol: A dangerous love affair, and authored or co-authored 17 mathematical statistics books.

Selected bibliography

References

External links
 Google Scholar 

1938 births
Living people
People from Sydney
Australian emigrants to New Zealand
University of Auckland alumni
Alumni of the University of Manchester
Academics of the London School of Economics
Academic staff of the University of Auckland
Academic staff of the University of Otago
Fellows of the Royal Society of New Zealand
New Zealand statisticians
20th-century New Zealand mathematicians
21st-century New Zealand mathematicians
Biostatisticians